Fowlerichthys scriptissimus is a species of fish in the family Antennariidae. It is an oviparous species that reaches and reportedly may exceed  SL. On March 28, 2012, an individual measuring  SL was collected off the coast of Jejudo, marking the first record of this species from Korean waters.

References 

Antennariidae
Fish described in 1902